Maximiliano José Gagliardo (born 21 April 1983) is an Argentine association football player, who plays as a goalkeeper for Barracas Central.

He played for Barracas Central of the Argentine Primera División.

References

External links
 
 

1983 births
Living people
Argentine footballers
Argentine expatriate footballers
Association football goalkeepers
Club Almirante Brown footballers
El Porvenir footballers
Flandria footballers
Club Atlético Platense footballers
Deportivo Morón footballers
Unión San Felipe footballers
CSyD Tristán Suárez footballers
Defensa y Justicia footballers
Club Atlético Atlanta footballers
Club Atlético Los Andes footballers
Arsenal de Sarandí footballers
Barracas Central players
Primera B de Chile players
Argentine expatriate sportspeople in Chile
Expatriate footballers in Chile
People from Chivilcoy
Sportspeople from Buenos Aires Province